The 2021 PBA Governors' Cup, also known as the 2021 Honda PBA Governors' Cup for sponsorship reasons, was the second and last conference of the 2021 PBA season of the Philippine Basketball Association (PBA). The 20th edition of the Governors' Cup began on December 8, 2021, after the Inter-Agency Task Force for the Management of Emerging Infectious Diseases (IATF-EID) approved the league's request, and ended on April 22, 2022.

This was the first import-laced tournament held by the league since the 2019 PBA Governors' Cup.

For the first two weeks of the tournament, the league returned to the Ynares Sports Arena with no audience in the venue. Quezon City then gave the permission for sports events to be held there with spectators; the PBA is expected to play at the Araneta Coliseum for the rest of the tournament starting December 15.

On January 3, 2022, the league postponed its scheduled games from January 5 to 9 after Metro Manila was put on Alert Level 3 due to the rising COVID-19 cases. The tournament was subsequently postponed indefinitely on January 6. The tournament resumed on February 11 after the alert level in Metro Manila was downgraded to Alert Level 2. The games were temporarily moved to the Ynares Center from February 23 to 27 as the Araneta Coliseum was used for the February window of the 2023 FIBA Basketball World Cup qualification.

Format
The following format will be observed for the duration of the conference:
 Single round-robin eliminations; 11 games per team; Teams are then seeded by basis on win–loss records.
Top eight teams will advance to the quarterfinals. In case of tie, playoff games will be held only for the #8 seed.
Quarterfinals:
QF1: #1 vs #8 (#1 twice-to-beat)
QF2: #2 vs #7 (#2 twice-to-beat)
QF3: #3 vs #6 (#3 twice-to-beat)
QF4: #4 vs #5 (#4 twice-to-beat)
Semifinals (best-of-5 series):
SF1: QF1 Winner vs. QF4 Winner
SF2: QF2 Winner vs. QF3 Winner
Finals (best-of-7 series)
F1: SF1 Winner vs SF2 Winner

Elimination round

Team standings

Schedule

Results

Eighth seed playoff

Bracket

Quarterfinals
All match-ups have the higher-seeded team having the twice-to-beat advantage, where they have to be beaten twice, and their opponents just once, to advance.

(1) Magnolia vs. (8) Phoenix Super LPG

(2) NLEX vs (7) Alaska

(3) TNT vs (6) Barangay Ginebra

(4) Meralco vs (5) San Miguel

Semifinals
All match-ups are best-of-five playoffs.

(1) Magnolia vs. (4) Meralco

(2) NLEX vs. (6) Barangay Ginebra

Finals

The Finals is a best-of-seven playoff.

Imports 
The following is the list of imports, which had played for their respective teams at least once, with the returning imports in italics. Highlighted are the imports who stayed with their respective teams for the whole conference.

Awards

Players of the Week

Statistics

Individual statistical leaders

Local players

Import players

Individual game highs

Local players

Import players

Team statistical leaders

References

Governors' Cup
PBA Governors' Cup
PBA Governors' Cup 2021